The War at Home may refer to:
 The War at Home (1996 film), a motion picture starring Emilio Estevez, Kathy Bates and Martin Sheen
 The War at Home (1979 film), a documentary film about Madison, Wisconsin area resistance to the Vietnam War
 The War at Home (TV series), a primetime TV series on Fox
 "The War at Home" (The West Wing), an episode of the TV series The West Wing
 "The War at Home" (Law & Order: Criminal Intent), a 2006 episode of the TV series Law & Order: Criminal Intent